Kagiso Modupe, is a South African actor and producer. He is best known for his roles in the popular serials Losing Lerato, Gog' Helen and Unpredictable Romance.

Personal life
He is married to Liza Lopes, a film producer. The couple has two daughters. His elder daughter, Tshimollo acted with Kagiso in the film Losing Lerato as the lead role 'Lerato'.

Career
In 2019, he starred in lead role 'Thami' in the blockbuster Losing Lerato. The film was funded by Kagiso and his wife Liza. The film screened in cinemas across South Africa and eSwatini. The film was not screened in Botswana due to  red tape. The film received critical acclaim and won six awards at the Idyllwild International Festival of Cinema in California. Kagiso won the Best Actor Feature award, Samela Tyelbooi won Best Actress Feature, his daughter Tshimollo won the Best Child Performance award. Besides the major awards, the film won Golden Era Humanitarian Narrative Award, Best Original Score Award and Festival Favourite Award.

In the meantime, he dubbed the voice for “Tyler Perry” of Mzansi. He also acted in the popular television serial Scandal! with the role 'Mangaliso "Mangi" Nyathi'. After few years, he quit from the role.

Apart from acting, he became an author with the book Along Came Tsakani.

Filmography

References

External links
 
 Kagiso Madupe articles

Living people
South African male television actors
South African male film actors
South African film producers
Year of birth missing (living people)